Water parsnip is a common name given to a number of flowering plants in the family Apiaceae, including those from the Berula and Sium genera.

Berula
Berula erecta, cutleaf water parsnip or water parsnip
Sium
Sium latifolium, greater water parsnip, or water parsnip
Sium suave, or water parsnip